Bederkesa is a former Samtgemeinde ("collective municipality") in the district of Cuxhaven, in Lower Saxony, Germany. Its seat was in the village Bad Bederkesa. It was disbanded in January 2015, when its member municipalities merged into the new municipality Geestland.

The Samtgemeinde Bederkesa consisted of the following municipalities:

 Bad Bederkesa
 Drangstedt
 Elmlohe
 Flögeln
 Köhlen
 Kührstedt
 Lintig
 Ringstedt

References

Cuxhaven (district)
1971 establishments in West Germany
Former Samtgemeinden in Lower Saxony